Urumiit or uruniit (Inuktitut syllabics: ᐅᕈᓅᑦ, uruniit; Greenlandic: urumiit) is a term used by native Inuit in Greenland and the Canadian High Arctic to refer to the feces of the rock ptarmigan (Lagopus muta) and the willow ptarmigan (Lagopus lagopus), which are considered a delicacy in their food cultures. The droppings are collected when they have dried out during the winter months (fresh droppings in the summer are thought to be unpleasant to eat), a time in which food sources are scarce, especially on land, so the pre-digested willow and birch plant matter in ptarmigan scat provides a much needed source of nutrition in a harsh environment. One ptarmigan may defecate as many as 50 times in one spot, so urumiit is very plentiful and easy to gather. The pellet-shaped droppings are generally cooked in rancidified seal fat before eating; sometimes mixed with seal or ptarmigan meat or blood. Historically in some areas, the meat cooked with urumiit is prepared by being pre-chewed by the women of a household. The smell of cooked urumiit in rancid fat has been compared to that of Gorgonzola cheese. It has been cited as a dish which non-Inuit are particularly likely to find disgusting, and as an example how much taste in food can vary between cultural contexts.

See also 
Coprophagia

References 

Inuit cuisine
Foods and drinks produced with excrement